McCan Barracks (Irish: Dún Mhic Cana) is the site of two agents of the Irish state: the Garda Síochána College and the Defence Forces. It is located in Templemore, County Tipperary, Ireland. It is named after Pierce McCan who fought in the Irish War of Independence.
It took on the role as the national centre for training the Garda Síochána – Ireland's police force – in 1964 when Garda Headquarters in the Phoenix Park ceased to perform that role. The barracks is home to a unit of the Irish Army Reserve and also houses a small detachment of the regular defence forces (Irish Army).

Early history
Prior to the achievement of independence, it was known as Richmond Barracks, after the area of the town in which it is located. The 17-acre site for Richmond Barracks was donated to the British crown by the local landlord - Sir John Craven Carden, 1st baronet Templemore in September 1808. Its long story began when the British Government decided that yet another barracks was required in County Tipperary. They first decided on a site in Thurles beside the River Suir. However, as its site was adjacent to the local Convent of the Ursuline Nuns,  the nuns successfully objected to a military barracks so near to their foundation.  As a result, the War Office decided to build the post in Templemore instead. Its construction was started and completed in the first decade of 1800. Sir John Carden also gave a training and recreation ground of 40 acres adjoining. The barracks had two squares, surrounded by company lines, stores, married quarters, officers mess block, church, military prison and hospital.  The site was surrounded by a high wall, with projecting fire positions at each corner. It had accommodation as follows: commanding officer's house and garden, quarters for two field officers, 23 other officers, married quarters for 48 other ranks, and for 767 other unmarried personnel. It also had 36 hospital beds, 15 guard room cells, and stabling for 27 officers’ horses.

Richmond Barracks
The new barracks was named Richmond Barracks. This name and those given at the time to facilities in close vicinity recalled historic events of that era, such as Talavera Place, Vinerma Mall, Regent Bridge and so on. The establishment of the barracks gave an enormous boost to the economic and social life of Templemore, with business in the town developing around it. Though due to the good demand for the usual farm produces in the barracks there was for many years no market in the town itself for these goods.
The town's unusually large number of licensed houses were well patronised by the troops. They also supplied the various messes and canteens; Richmond Barracks was also an important post during the various Irish rebellions, and also during England's foreign wars.  
In the Irish 1848 Rising troops were assigned from here to round up and arrest suspects in Ballingarry after their brave but ill-prepared attempt for freedom.

Location

The situation of the barracks was on the regular grid pattern for which the town of Templemore is noted and for which Sir John Craven Carden was also responsible. It occupies the most elevated ground in the town and is less than 50 meters from the main gate lodge of the Priory - the main residence of the baronet. A broad boulevard (Church Avenue) extends from the entrance gates over the River Mall at "Small Bridge" to the crossroads at Bank Street (called Military Street pre-independence). From the crossroads, the left hand road proceeds directly to the Town Hall while straight ahead, the Avenue leads to the Church of the Sacred Heart (Roman Catholic). The right hand road terminates at Templemore railway station which opened on 3 July 1848. Proximity to the station greatly facilitated the rapid movement of crown forces throughout the province of Munster.

Templemore races 1856
Relations between the Military and the local townspeople in Templemore were not always the best. There is at least one occasion known when there was a serious fracas between both parties. That was on race day held in Templemore in April 1856. It began as a fine happy occasion with an attendance of some 1,300 men from the Barracks. Towards the end of the day however, the soldiers began to fight with the civilians. As the number of combatants grew the soldiers began to gather in groups, then taking off their belts they attacked the crowd indiscriminately. The Tipperary men, armed with sticks, gave a good account of themselves.  Eventually, the combatants were separated by a squad of armed soldiers with bayonets fixed and aided by police. The troops were lined up ready to march back to the barracks when a civilian approached an officer to lodge a complaint. The soldiers broke ranks to attack him, so the free for all fight broke out again. It was not that the people were trying to force a fight, but the soldiers began taunting them, shouting "we have beaten Tipperary". This got the blood of the people so up that they turned on the military with such ferocity that they were forced to retreat. That night in the Templemore barracks, the casualty list showed 3 men near to death, another close to losing an eye and an officer with a broken arm.

Fenians
During the late 1850s and 60s, when the Fenian Brotherhood was being organised, a large number of Irishmen who were soldiers in the British Army all over Ireland, were 'sworn in' as members of the Fenian movement. This is what happened in Templemore in a big way. As a result of this in December 1885, the 11th Depot Battalion which had been stationed here for a long time, was broken up and transferred to Newry and Enniskillen. It was then replaced by the 59th Regiment from Glasgow. The reason was published at the time in The Nenagh Guardian which reported:
 The reason assigned for the transfer of the 11th Depot Battalion from Templemore is that it was strongly suspected that those troops were tainted with Fenianism. Templemore is the Headquarters of a Depot Battn. And the majority of those soldiers are recruits drafted from several parts of Ireland, but Tipperary-men predominate. Several of these soldiers were constantly entering public houses and associating with persons whose feeling of loyalty was not strong. The officers knew this, and the Commanding Officer – Colonel W. Irwin – spoke to the men on the subject, but his words had no effect. Those troops are now being replaced by an English Battalion. The people of the town very much regret the change. In addition it may be mentioned that the 11th Battn hunted its own pack of hounds, and when leaving, the officers offered for sale by private treaty "30 dogs, 27 horses, and a large amount of leather equipment for same". 

Apparently even when transferred to Enniskillen, the troops retained their 'taint of Fenianism', because again in the Nenagh Guardian it is stated: "Two private soldiers lately removed from Templemore to Enniskillen on account of a report that some of their Battn were tampering with Fenianism, were arrested in Enniskillen for singing Fenian songs. They were placed in the cells pending orders from Dublin. When arrested one of the soldiers remarked that the whole company to which he belonged might as well be arrested as him."

It can be recalled that the first Fenian Centre in Templemore—Mr Patrick Mackey—was married to a daughter of a Colonel commanding the troops in the barracks. She became a Catholic in order to do so. After her husband died she moved with her family to Newry to where part of the 11th Battn. had been transferred. One of the suggested dates for the Fenian Rising was to have been in May 1865, and on the particular night 10 of the 11 soldiers on guard duty at the barracks were Fenians. Had the Rising taken place on that night (rather than in 1867) it is interesting to speculate what the outcome might have been considering the large number of Fenians in the Regiment at the time and the huge amount of armaments that could have been made available.

At a local Petty Sessions Court in Templemore on 15 May 1865, an old woman was sentenced to one month imprisonment for stealing a key from the door of one Capt. Thomas Borrow of the 11th Battn This Capt Borrow was the father of the famous novelist George Borrow who accompanied his father when his Battn. moved to Templemore. He wrote many novels (such as Lavengro etc.), and mentions the town in some of his books, describing his wandering on horseback around the locality and up to the ‘Devil's Bit’ mountain.

World War I
By 1909 Richmond barracks had been vacated, and Templemore town council were informed by the War Office that there was ‘no prospect of troops being quartered there in the near future’.  However, the period of the First World War (1914–-1918) was a time of great activity for the then Richmond Barracks. At the outbreak of the war the British Government used the Barracks as a huge prisoner of war camp in which during the first years of the war several hundred German prisoners were interned. They were Prussian Guards, considered some of the best soldiers in the German Army.  To contain them the two barracks squares were divided into four typical concentration camp compounds surrounded by heavy barbed wire entanglements, each with a high sentry observation tower having a well-sited machine gun and search lights.  By the end of 1914 the camp contained over 2,000 German and Austrian prisoners.

The prisoners were about equally divided between the Catholic and Protestant faiths and each Sunday they marched down to their respective churches usually singing their National songs. One of each faith died while there and were buried in the local cemetery. Some years ago their remains were removed and interred in the German National Cemetery in Glencree. Early in 1916, the German prisoners were eventually transferred to England.  It was rumoured that the South Tipperary Volunteers were planning the release of the prisoners.

After the Barracks was vacated it then became a vast training centre for the Royal Munster Fusiliers. Thousands were trained here and sad scenes were often witnessed when 'drafts' were entrained for the Western Front on their way to the battle fields of Passchendaele and the Somme. During training the recruits would often have to march about 90 km from Templemore to practise on the firing ranges in Kilworth.  While in the camp the troops learnt all about digging full-sized trenches complete with redoubts in the area that was restored from what looked like a battle ground into the local Golf Links, when the  Garda Síochána College arrived in 1964. During their stay in Templemore the Chaplain to the Munster Fusiliers was a local man Father Francis Gleeson, who became well known for his unselfish devotion to duty on the Western Front.

The Troubles
During the Easter Rising, the barracks was occupied by the 10th Battalion of the Northamptonshire Regiment under the command of Major Phibbs. At the end of World War I, the regiment still occupied the barracks.  On two occasions during the War of Independence, the regiment carried out reprisals in the town – one for the shooting of District Inspector Wilson who was shot in Patrick Street after which they completely burned the Town Hall and on the second occasion wrecking most of the houses in the town to avenge a successful ambush. During those years the troops were used against the Irish Republican Army in County Tipperary, together with the Black and Tans and the Auxiliaries (stationed in Sir John Cardon's residence, later burned down in the civil war).
The war ended with the truce of July 1921. The barracks was then handed over to the Irish Republican Army on 13 February 1922. The handing over was made at a ceremony in the barracks, with Major Phibbs, O/C of the 10th Battn. Northamptonshire Regt., signing for the British Forces and Comdt. Sean Scott, O/C 2nd Battn. 2nd Mid-Tipperary Brigade IRA signing for the Republican side.

McCan Barracks
The 2nd Mid-Tipperary Brigade now took over under the command of Brigadier James Leahy together and his Adjutant Michael Hynes. The name of the post was changed to McCan  Barracks. This was to commemorate the first Sinn Féin MP. for Mid-Tipperary, Pierce McCan , who died on hunger strike in Gloucester Prison in 1919.

Following the signing of the Anglo-Irish Treaty of December 1921 and the establishment of the Irish Provisional Government the troops in the barracks decided to support the anti-treaty side in the Irish Civil War and put the barracks in a state of defence. Troops of the National Army soon occupied the town, and were prepared to attack the barracks. Through the intervention of Dr. John Harty, then Archbishop of Cashel and Emly, hostilities were called off and the troops in possession were allowed to evacuate. After the legal establishment of the Defence Forces in October 1924 the Irish Army remained in possession until 1929.

When World War II commenced in 1939, the barracks was again occupied, this time by the 10th Southern Battalion of the Irish Army, where a very large garrison was stationed until The Emergency ended, when the barracks was again vacated. During the 1950s a number of very successful FCA camps were held here. When the FCAs were integrated into the regular army, the McCan barracks became the headquarters of the 3rd, F.A Regt., and of the 9th Field Battery of that Regt., which it still is.

Garda College 
The site took on the new role of the Garda (Ireland's National Police) training centre in February 1964 when the Garda Headquarters in the Phoenix Park ceased to perform that role. The barracks was taken over by the Minister for Justice and completely redesigned and reconstructed, adding many facilities to it. It operated as a training centre until It closed in 1987 and modernized to the most up to date standards in Europe. It reopened as The Garda College in 1989 and has had a long and fascinating history since being built in 1815. It has been centrally involved in Rebellions, the Great War, the Anglo-Irish War, the Civil War, the foundation of a new State, and more recently, has found a new lease of life as a Police Training facility and third level institution.

See also
 List of Irish military installations

References

Barracks in the Republic of Ireland
Buildings and structures in County Tipperary
Templemore